Sennet Glacier is a precipitous glacier between Yancey and Merrick Glaciers in the Britannia Range, flowing southward from Mount Aldrich to the Byrd Glacier.

References

Glaciers of Oates Land